Praying with Lior is a 2008 documentary about a Jewish boy, Lior, who has Down syndrome.  The film follows Lior and his family as they prepare for Lior's bar mitzvah.

References

External links

British documentary films
Down syndrome in film
Documentary films about Jews and Judaism
2008 films
2008 documentary films
Documentary films about children with disability
First Run Features films
2000s English-language films
2000s British films